Railway Mixed Higher Secondary School is a secondary school in Perambur, Chennai, India and was founded by east india company in 1891. It was created for Railway Employee children under British rule. But now it is open for all.

Enrollment
Enrollment varies by year, but has averaged 2000 students studying in the school since 1990.

Principals

Vice Principals

Houses

Closure of Railway Schools
In 2018, Indian Railways announced its intent to withdraw support for its Railway Schools after 2018–19. Later, it revised its position, announcing support for schools with fifteen to twenty wards of railway employees.

References 

Railway Mixed Higher Secondary School, Perambur, Chennai, 10 July 2012

Schools in Colonial India
Railway schools in India
High schools and secondary schools in Chennai
Educational institutions established in 1891
1891 establishments in India